Sir Speedy (born Juan Antonio Ortiz Garcia) is a Puerto Rican reggaeton musician.

In 2005, he released a remix of the single "Siéntelo" ("Feel It") which was originally recorded for the 2001 various artists compilation, Sandunguero by DJ Blass. The remix featured Lumidee and hit the top 10 in Belgium, Finland, France, Switzerland, and the Netherlands. Billboard called it "the first international reggaetón hit". PopMatters critic Matt Cibula described Speedy as "charismatic and spunky", and said that despite its sometimes confusing lyrics and Speedy's "thin" voice, Speedy's 2005 album Nueva Generación was possibly the best reggaeton album of the year and "an excellent example of what intelligent and sophisticated but unpretentious pop music can do when it wants to."

Other artists he has worked with include Plan B, Daddy Yankee and Lito & Polaco. Speedy is currently working on new mixtapes for his label Yoko-Joe Records.

Discography

Studio albums
2001: Haciendo El Amor Con La Ropa
2003: Dando Cocotazos
2005: Nueva Generación
2008: From PR 2 TR
2012: Ayer y Hoy
2018: Real Reggaeton

Mixtapes
2008: Mazakote Mixtape: Gold Edition Vol. 1

Singles
1999: Los Gargolas del Escuadrón (Gargolas Vol. 2)
2000: Sexo Quieren Tener (DJ Joe Y Trebol Clan: Los Genios Musicales)
2000: El Amor Con La Ropa (Reggaeton Sex Vol. 2)
2001: Hora Del Baile (feat. Genio Killa) (Reggaeton Sex Vol. 3)
2001: Yales Danzan (DJ Joe: Fatal Fantasy Vol. 1)
2003: Vamo Alla (feat. Blade Pacino, Great Kilo) (DJ Blass: Sandunguero Vol. 2)
2003: Rosa
2004: Te Quiero Mi Yal
2005: Siéntelo (Remix) (feat. Lumidee)
2007: Suavemente (Remix) (feat. Elvis Crespo)
2010: Brulemua (feat. Guelo Star)
2012: Quico (feat. Zindel, Manguera´´El Escolta´´, JQ, Nico Mastre, ZK & Aisack)
2013: A Ella Le Gusta El Sex (feat. Polakan)
2014: Brulemua (feat Guelo Star)
2016:Conversemos sobre sexo, Cuidandome lo mio, Guillate Cabron
2017: De lejos se te ve feat (Guelo Star)
2018: Magneto Sexual, 
2019: Se le Dio, Rakata
2020: Quiero (ft. Ñengo Flow, Brray, Dayme & El High)

References

Living people
Puerto Rican rappers
Puerto Rican reggaeton musicians
21st-century American rappers
Music-related YouTube channels
Trap musicians (EDM)
21st-century Puerto Rican male singers
Date of birth missing (living people)
1979 births